Patrick Thomas Leonard (born October 20, 1992) is an American former professional baseball first baseman.

High school
Leonard attended Bartram Trail High School in St. Johns, Florida, for his freshman year. He transferred to Creekside High School, also in St. John's, for his sophomore year. For his junior year, Leonard was home schooled in order to fit more time in for baseball. He still played for Creekside's baseball team, recording a .452 batting average and a 6–1 win–loss record with a 0.64 earned run average as a pitcher, and was named The St. Augustine Records St. Johns County Player of the Year. He committed to enroll at the University of Georgia to play college baseball for the Georgia Bulldogs.

Before his senior year, his family moved to Houston, Texas, where Leonard continued his education at St. Thomas High School. As a senior, he opted not to pitch in order to focus on his hitting. He had a .434 batting average, 12 home runs, and 56 runs batted in (RBIs). St. Thomas won the Texas State Class 5A championship.

Professional career

Kansas City Royals
The Kansas City Royals selected Leonard in the fifth round, with the 156th overall selection, of the 2011 MLB Draft. He signed with the Royals, receiving a $600,000 signing bonus, forgoing his commitment to Georgia. Leonard played for the Burlington Royals of the Rookie-level Appalachian League in 2012, and was named to the league's postseason All-Star team.

Tampa Bay Rays
On December 9, 2012, the Royals traded Leonard to the Rays with Jake Odorizzi, Wil Myers, and Mike Montgomery for James Shields and Wade Davis. He played for the Bowling Green Hot Rods of the Class A Midwest League in 2013. In 2014, he played for the Charlotte Stone Crabs of the Class A-Advanced Florida State League, and was named to the league's all-star game.

Leonard played for the Montgomery Biscuits of the Class AA Southern League in 2015. He began the 2016 season with the Durham Bulls of the Class AAA International League, but was demoted midseason to Montgomery. He returned to Durham at the start of the 2017 season. He was named the International League Player of the Month for April 2017. Leonard elected free agency on November 2, 2018.

Chicago White Sox 
On November 22, 2017 Leonard signed a minor league deal with the White Sox.

Milwaukee Brewers
On March 5, 2019 Leonard signed a minor league deal with the Brewers. He was released on June 2, 2020.

References

External links

1992 births
Living people
Baseball players from Jacksonville, Florida
Baseball first basemen
Burlington Royals players
Bowling Green Hot Rods players
Charlotte Stone Crabs players
Montgomery Biscuits players
Peoria Javelinas players
Brisbane Bandits players
Durham Bulls players
Charlotte Knights players
Biloxi Shuckers players
Minor league baseball players